Back Sang-Won (Hangul: 백상원) (born January 2, 1988, in Daegu) is a South Korean former infielder, who played 6 seasons for the Samsung Lions in the Korea Baseball Organization. He bats left-handed and throws right-handed.

Amateur career 
Back was first called up to the South Korean collegiate national team as a junior at Dankook University in  when he batted .403 in the national collegiate league. With South Korea, he competed in the IBAF World University Baseball Championship held in Czech Republic. Back batted .286 and drove in 3 runs and stole 2 bases, playing as a starting second baseman. He went 2-for-3, including a RBI double, off "Handkerchief Prince" Yuki Saito in the team's semifinal against Japan.

Notable international careers

Professional career 

After graduation from Dankook University, Back was drafted in the  KBO Entry Draft by the Samsung Lions as the 4th pick of the 4th round, 28th overall. In the 2010 Futures League, Back was ranked first in batting average with .306, playing in 106 games. However, Back spent his entire 2010 season in the Lions' second-tier team.

After the 2010 season, Back joined the Korea Armed Forces Athletic Corps Baseball Team to serve a two-year military duty. In October 2011, Back competed in the 2011 Baseball World Cup as a member of the South Korean national baseball team. In the tourney, he shared second base duties with Choi Joo-Hwan but struggled at the plate, batting just .154. The Lions released Sang-won on October 19, 2018.

Notable international careers

References

External links 
 Profile and stats on the KBO official site
 Back Sang-Won on Samsung Lions Baseball Club

Samsung Lions players
KBO League second basemen
South Korean baseball players
1988 births
Living people
Sportspeople from Daegu